Karapet Mikaelyan (born 27 September 1969) is a former Russian-born Armenian football striker. Karapet was also a member of Armenia national team, participated in 20 international matches and scored 2 goals since his debut on 5 October 1996, in away match against Northern Ireland.

Health problems
In September 2011, Mikaelyan has been diagnosed with severe heart failure and was in urgent need of heart transplantation. The fans of his former clubs FC Zvezda Irkutsk and FC Krylia Sovetov Samara had raised funds to finance his heart surgery. However, the president of Armenian Football Federation Ruben Hayrapetyan has announced that the heart operation will be financed through his federation.

Mikaelyan underwent heart surgery on 14 March 2013. The Union of Football Players and Coaches of Russia was raising money for Mikayelyan's surgery since 25 February. The 935,000 rubles (approx. $30,487)-worth surgery went successfully. FC Krylia Sovetov and the Football Federation of Armenia were among those that had provided financial support to Karapet Mikaelyan.

International goals

References

External links
 
 

Living people
1969 births
Armenian footballers
Soviet footballers
Armenia international footballers
FC Smena Komsomolsk-na-Amure players
FC Zvezda Irkutsk players
FC Sokol Saratov players
Jeju United FC players
PFC Krylia Sovetov Samara players
FC Dynamo Stavropol players
Russian Premier League players
K League 1 players
Armenian expatriate footballers
Expatriate footballers in Russia
Expatriate footballers in South Korea
Russian expatriate sportspeople in South Korea
Armenian expatriate sportspeople in South Korea
Footballers from Moscow
Russian people of Armenian descent
Association football forwards
FC Chita players
FC Spartak Nizhny Novgorod players
Soviet Armenians